Bluejacket is a town in eastern Craig County, Oklahoma, United States. The population was 339 at the 2010 census, an increase of 23.7 percent over the figure of 274 recorded in 2000.  Bluejacket was named for its first postmaster, the Rev. Charles Blue Jacket, one-time chief of the Shawnee and grandson of noted leader Blue Jacket.

History
Bluejacket was founded as a station designated by the Missouri, Kansas and Texas Railway (KATY) in 1871, as it built a line through Indian Territory from Kansas to Texas. A post office was established in 1882, and Chief Bluejacket was appointed as the first postmaster. The town was incorporated in the Cherokee Nation in 1894.

During the late 1930s, two tornadoes severely damaged Bluejacket. The first, on May 4, 1938, destroyed some barns and killed a farmer and several head of livestock. The second, on August 24, 1939, destroyed much of the business district. This storm killed two young men and caused an estimated half million dollars' worth of damage in the county.

Geography

Demographics

In the census of 2000, there were 274 people, 99 households, and 69 families residing in the town. The racial makeup of the town was 66.42% White, 18.25% Native American, 1.09% African American, and 14.23% from two or more races.

There were 99 households, out of which 40.4% had children under the age of 18 living with them, 49.5% were married couples living together, 13.1% had a female householder with no husband present, and 30.3% were non-families. 28.3% of all households were made up of individuals, and 18.2% had someone living alone who was 65 years of age or older. The average household size was 2.72 and the average family size was 3.33.

In the town, the population was spread out, with 31.8% under the age of 18, 9.1% from 18 to 24, 24.5% from 25 to 44, 21.5% from 45 to 64, and 13.1% who were 65 years of age or older. The median age was 34 years. For every 100 females, there were 81.5 males. For every 100 females age 18 and over, there were 81.6 males.

The median income for a household in the town was $26,458, and the median income for a family was $33,250. Males had a median income of $26,000 versus $23,750 for females. The per capita income for the town was $11,755. About 11.3% of families and 14.3% of the population were below the poverty line, including 17.3% of those under the age of eighteen and 30.6% of those 65 or over.

Notable people
 Fern Holland, a lawyer who was killed in the Iraq conflict
 Martha Goodwin Tunstall, women's suffragist and temperance activist, d. 1911 in Bluejacket

References

Towns in Craig County, Oklahoma
Towns in Oklahoma